Ineke Dezentjé Hamming-Bluemink (born 15 September 1954) is a former Dutch politician. As a member of the People's Party for Freedom and Democracy (VVD) she was elected to the House of Representatives from 3 June 2003 to 9 November 2011. She focused on matters linked to the Algemene Ouderdomswet and other pensions affairs. She was succeeded by Ybeltje Berckmoes-Duindam when she resigned to become corporate director of employers' organization FME-CWM.

Previously, she was a member from 2002 to 2004 of the municipal council of Cromstrijen and studied law at Erasmus University Rotterdam.

References 
  Parlement.com biography

External links 
  People's Party for Freedom and Democracy biography

1954 births
Living people
Dutch civil servants
Dutch public relations people
Dutch columnists
Dutch corporate directors
Dutch women jurists
Dutch trade association executives
Erasmus University Rotterdam alumni
Members of the Social and Economic Council
Members of the House of Representatives (Netherlands)
Municipal councillors in South Holland
People from Cromstrijen
People's Party for Freedom and Democracy politicians
21st-century Dutch politicians
21st-century Dutch women politicians
Dutch women columnists
Dutch women writers